Joan Develin Coley served as president of McDaniel College, Westminster, Maryland from 2000 to 2010. She served as interim president for Notre Dame of Maryland University starting in August 2013 during the presidential search for that university.

Education
A.B. English Honors, Albright College
M.Ed., Secondary Education Reading, University of Maryland, College Park
Doctorate, Elementary Education Reading, University of Maryland, College Park

McDaniel College
 President – 2001
 Interim President – 2000
 Provost and Dean of the Faculty – 1994–2000
 Acting Vice President for Academic Affairs and Dean of the Faculty – 1993–94
 Dean of Graduate Affairs, Professor – 1992–93
 Professor, Chair of Education Dept. & Director of Graduate Reading Program – 1986–92
 Director of Admissions – 1985
 Associate Dean/Academic Affairs – 1983–85
 Director of Continuing Education – 1982
 Director, American Publishers Assn. Literacy Project, Washington, D.C. (sabbatical) — 1980–81
 Associate Professor, Education Dept. & Director Graduate Reading Program – 1977
 Assistant Professor, Education Dept. & Director Graduate Reading Program – 1973

Accomplishments and honors
 Outstanding Teacher Educator in Reading given by the Maryland Council of the International Reading Association (1989)
 Good Scout Award, Boy Scouts of America (2010)
 Circle of Excellence, Top 100 Women in Maryland, Daily Record (2004)
 Top 100 Women in Maryland, Daily Record (2000, 2002)
Outstanding Teacher Educator in Reading at the Higher Education Level (1989)
 Maryland Higher Education Reading Association, president (1975–76)
 Mid-Atlantic Reading Research Consortium, president (1987–99)

References

External links
McDaniel College

Year of birth missing (living people)
Living people
McDaniel College people
Notre Dame of Maryland University faculty
American women writers
People from Maryland
Writers from Philadelphia
Albright College alumni
University of Maryland, College Park alumni
21st-century American women
Women heads of universities and colleges